The following is a list of largest universities in the world by country listing only the largest university in each country. This is not a list of largest individual campuses with in-person (non-distance) enrollment. This list includes distance enrollment and multiple-campus institutions.

List of universities

See also
List of largest universities by enrollment
List of the largest United States colleges and universities by enrollment

References

Lists of education-related superlatives